Horace Bélanger (June 11, 1836 – October 1, 1892) was born in Rivière-Ouelle, Lower Canada and became involved in the fur trade with the Hudson's Bay Company.

During his career with the HBC, Bélanger became the first French Canadian to become a Chief Factor. He ended his service at Norway House, Manitoba where he became Justice of the Peace for the Keewatin District. A stone monument was erected there in his memory after his drowning death at Sea River Falls on the Nelson River.

Bélanger's half-brother was Luc Letellier de Saint-Just.

References 
 Biography at the Dictionary of Canadian Biography Online
 Manitoba Historical Society - Horace Belanger
 Hudson's Bay Company Archives

Canadian fur traders
1836 births
1892 deaths
People from Bas-Saint-Laurent
People from Northern Region, Manitoba
Accidental deaths in Manitoba
Deaths by drowning in Canada